Dendropsophus dutrai is a species of frog in the family Hylidae.
It is endemic to Brazil.
Its natural habitats are subtropical or tropical moist lowland forests and intermittent freshwater marshes.
It is threatened by habitat loss.

References

Sources

dutrai
Endemic fauna of Brazil
Amphibians described in 1996
Taxonomy articles created by Polbot